The Asia Rugby Championship for women's national fifteen-a-side teams is a rugby union tournament that has been contested since 2006. Organised by Asia Rugby, there are currently two competition divisions. The championship is also the continental qualifying tournament for Asian women's teams in the lead up to the Rugby World Cup.

Previous winners

All-time summary
Up to and including the 2022 edition, the following women's teams' Championship division top-3 finishes in tournaments:

Asia Rugby Championship

Division tournaments

Notes:

 Some sources suggest that the match in Tokyo was for the 2010 ARFU Division 1 XV Championship.

 Relegated to the division below.

 Able to be challenged by the winner of the division below to play in a promotion-relegation play-off.

 Won promotion, or the right to a challenge play-off for promotion, to the division above.

 Development tournament organised by ARFU in 2010. The games were 40 minutes long and were not test matches.

2016 Asia Pacific Championship

This tournament doubled as the qualification to the 2017 Women's Rugby World Cup, which is why Fiji (by virtue of winning the 2016 Oceania Rugby Women’s Championship) is attending. The top two teams directly qualify to the World Cup.

See also
 Women's international rugby union
 Asia Rugby Championship (for men)

References

Women's rugby union competitions for national teams
Rugby Championship
Recurring sporting events established in 2006
Women's rugby union competitions in Asia
Rugby union competitions in Asia for national teams
2006 establishments in Asia